The 1932 South Georgia Teachers Blue Tide football team represented the South Georgia Teachers College—now known as Georgia Southern University—during the 1932 college football season. The team was led by Crook Smith in his fourth year as head coach.

Schedule

References

South Georgia Teachers
Georgia Southern Eagles football seasons
South Georgia Teachers Blue Tide football